The 24th Annual Screen Actors Guild Awards, honoring the best achievements in film and television performances for the year 2017, were presented on January 21, 2018 at the Shrine Auditorium in Los Angeles, California. The ceremony was broadcast on both TNT and TBS 8:00 p.m. EST / 5:00 p.m. PST. On December 4, 2017, it was announced that the ceremony would have its first ever host in its twenty-four year history, with actress Kristen Bell presiding over the award show. The nominees were announced on December 13, 2017.

Morgan Freeman was announced as the 2017 SAG Life Achievement Award recipient on August 22, 2017.

Winners and nominees
Note: Winners are listed first and highlighted in boldface.

Film

Television

Screen Actors Guild Life Achievement Award
 Morgan Freeman

In Memoriam
Source: The segment honors the following who died in 2017.

 Miguel Ferrer
 John Hurt
 Bill Paxton
 Jeanne Moreau
 Robert Guillaume
 Powers Boothe
 Adam West
 Martin Landau
 John Heard
 Glen Campbell
 Jerry Lewis
 John Hillerman
 Mike Hodge
 Harry Dean Stanton
 Richard Anderson
 Sam Shepard
 Bernie Casey
 Shelley Berman
 Ann Wedgeworth
 Rose Marie
 Glenne Headly
 Jay Thomas
 Charlie Murphy
 Nelsan Ellis
 Dina Merrill
 Joseph Bologna
 Roger Moore
 Loren Janes
 Dick Gregory
 June Foray
 Jerry Van Dyke
 Miriam Colon
 Elena Verdugo
 Paula Dell
 John Bernecker 
 Della Reese
 David Cassidy
 Jim Nabors
 Erin Moran
 Don Rickles

Presenters
Source:

 Halle Berry
 Dakota Fanning
 Lupita Nyong'o
 Emma Stone
 Kelly Marie Tran
 Mary J. Blige
 Jason Clarke
 Woody Harrelson
 Holly Hunter
 Daniel Kaluuya
 Zoe Kazan
 Frances McDormand
 Laurie Metcalf
 Kumail Nanjiani
 Sam Rockwell
 Ray Romano
 Saoirse Ronan
 Allison Williams
 Rosanna Arquette
 Gabrielle Carteris
 Mandy Moore
 Olivia Munn
 Niecy Nash
 Gina Rodriguez
 Maya Rudolph
 Marisa Tomei
 Connie Britton
 Geena Davis
 Goldie Hawn
 Kate Hudson
 Brie Larson
 Laura Linney
 Leslie Mann
 Megan Mullally
 Sarah Silverman
 Rita Moreno
 Molly Shannon

References

External links
 

2017
2017 film awards
2017 in American cinema
2017 in American television
2017 television awards
2018 in Los Angeles
January 2018 events in the United States